The Library of Anglo-Catholic Theology (published by John Henry Parker) was a series of 19th-century editions of theological works by writers in the Church of England, devoted as the title suggests to significant Anglo-Catholic figures. It brought back into print a number of works from the 17th century, concentrating though not exclusively on the Caroline Divines. The publication of the Library, from 1841, was connected with the Oxford Movement which had begun in 1833; some of the editors, such as William John Copeland and Charles Crawley were clearly identified with the movement. However the interests of the Library diverged early from those of the Tractarians. A total of 95 volumes by 20 writers was published over a dozen years; the plan, originally, had been to include 53 authors. The Library of Anglo-Catholic Theology was founded in response to the Parker Society.

Authors
Lancelot Andrewes (1555-1626), 11 volumes, edited by J. P. Wilson and James Bliss
William Beveridge (1637-1708), 12 volumes, edited by James Bliss
John Bramhall, 5 volumes, edited by Arthur West Haddan
George Bull, 7 volumes
John Cosin (1594-1672), 5 volumes
Richard Crakanthorp, edited by Christopher Wordsworth
William Forbes
Mark Frank, 2 volumes
Peter Gunning, edited by Charles Page Eden
Henry Hammond edited by Nicholas Pocock
George Hickes
John Johnson (1662-1726), editor John Baron
William Laud (1573-1645) edited by William Scott and James Bliss
Hamon L'Estrange
Nathaniel Marshall
William Nicholson
John Overall (1559-1619)
John Pearson (1613-1686), edited by Edward Churton (minor works)
Herbert Thorndike, 6 volumes, edited by Arthur West Haddan
Thomas Wilson (1663-1755) edited by John Keble

Committee
The committee members for the Library project were the following (serving 1840 to 1845 unless otherwise marked):

R. S. Barton
Edward Churton
William John Copeland (1844-5)
John Goulter Dowling (1840-1)
William Gresley 
Walter Farquhar Hook
Richard William Jelf
John Keble
Samuel Roffey Maitland (1840)
Henry Edward Manning (1845)
William Hodge Mill
George Moberly
John Henry Newman
Henry Handley Norris (1840-3)
William Palmer
Arthur Philip Perceval (1840-4)
Edward Bouverie Pusey 
Robert Isaac Wilberforce (1845)
Christopher Wordsworth (1845)

See also
Library of the Fathers
Parker Society

References

External links
Library of Anglo-Catholic Theology from Project Canterbury

Christian theology books
Anglican liturgy
Anglican theology and doctrine
Anglo-Catholicism
History of the Church of England
16th-century Christian texts
17th-century Christian texts
18th-century Christian texts